Electrona carlsbergi, the Electron subantarctic lanternfish, covers waters to the south of the Antarctic convergence to the Antarctic coast. Their life span is about five years, in which they mature after 2–3 years. They feed mainly on copepods, but also hyperiids and euphausiids.

Size

Etymology
The fish is named in honor of the Carlsberg Laboratory, Copenhagen, the research arm of the Carlsberg Foundation, which financed the Dana Expedition that collected the type specimen.

References

Myctophidae
Taxa named by Åge Vedel Tåning
Fish described in 1932